Pitcairnia compostelae is a plant species in the genus Pitcairnia. This species is endemic to Mexico.

References

compostelae
Flora of Mexico